The Republican Brain: The Science of Why They Deny Science — and Reality   is a 2012 book about the psychological basis for many Republicans' rejection of mainstream scientific theories, as well as theories of economics and history, by the American journalist Chris Mooney.

Reception
The Financial Times gave the book a favorable review, describing it as an "intelligent, nuanced and persuasive account" of psychological differences in political behavior.

Alissa Quart, in a New York Times opinion piece, cited conservative writers Alex Berezow and Hank Campbell who equated Mooney's argument with eugenics. It was criticized by American conservative Jonah Goldberg, who tried to associate it with "conservative phrenology". Mooney responded, stating that Goldberg had mispresented his book in several respects. Mooney also stated that Goldberg exhibited "precisely the traits he seeks to deny: ideological defensiveness, a lack of nuance, and a deeply unwarranted and overconfident sense of certainty".  Mooney later rebutted a similar criticism by Andrew Ferguson and stated that Ferguson dismissed science himself while attacking the book.

Paul Krugman wrote in The New York Times that Mooney makes a good point: the personality traits associated with modern conservatism, particularly a lack of openness, make the modern Republican Party hostile to the idea of objective inquiry.

Publication information

See also
 Antiscience
 Agnotology
 Climate change policy of the United States
 List of books about the politics of science
 Merchants of Doubt
 Politicization of science
 William R. Steiger

References

External links
 Chris C. Mooney, personal website
 Chris Mooney – The Republican Brain, Interview, Point of Inquiry
 
 Diagnosing the Republican Brain, Mother Jones

2012 non-fiction books
Science books
Current affairs books
Books about petroleum politics
War on Science
Books about the politics of science
Books critical of conservatism in the United States
Philosophy of science literature
Political philosophy literature
Contemporary philosophical literature
Wiley (publisher) books